The Glamorganshire Royal Horse Artillery was a Territorial Force Royal Horse Artillery battery that was formed in Glamorganshire in 1908.  It saw active service during the First World War on the Western Front in 1917 and 1918 as part of an Army Field Artillery Brigade.  A second line battery, 2/1st Glamorganshire RHA, served in England and Ireland before being broken up in January 1917.  Glamorganshire RHA was not reconstituted in the post-war Territorial Force.

History

Formation
The Territorial Force (TF) was formed on 1 April 1908 following the enactment of the Territorial and Reserve Forces Act 1907 (7 Edw.7, c.9) which combined and re-organised the old Volunteer Force, the Honourable Artillery Company and the Yeomanry.  On formation, the TF contained 14 infantry divisions and 14 mounted yeomanry brigades.  Each yeomanry brigade included a horse artillery battery and an ammunition column.

On 18 March 1908, Glamorganshire Royal Horse Artillery (Territorial Force) was proposed as a new unit and it was recognized by the Army Council on 26 May 1908; the ammunition column was recognized on 30 September 1908.  The unit consisted of
Battery HQ at Port Talbot
Glamorganshire Battery at Port Talbot
South Wales Brigade Ammunition Column also at Port Talbot

Some of the personnel for the new unit came from the 2nd Volunteer Battalion Welsh Regiment based in Cardiff, originally raised as Rifle Volunteers in 1859, some of whom had seen active service during the Second Boer War. (Other members of this battalion joined the 2nd Welsh Brigade, Royal Field Artillery, the remainder formed the 7th (Cyclist) Battalion, Welsh Regiment.)
 
The battery was equipped with four Ehrhardt 15-pounder guns and allocated as artillery support to the South Wales Mounted Brigade.

First World War

In accordance with the Territorial and Reserve Forces Act 1907 (7 Edw.7, c.9) which brought the Territorial Force into being, the TF was intended to be a home defence force for service during wartime and members could not be compelled to serve outside the country. However, on the outbreak of war on 4 August 1914, many members volunteered for Imperial Service.  Therefore, TF units were split into 1st Line (liable for overseas service) and 2nd Line (home service for those unable or unwilling to serve overseas) units.  2nd Line units performed the home defence role, although in fact most of these were also posted abroad in due course.

1/1st Glamorganshire
The 1st Line battery was embodied with the South Wales Mounted Brigade on 4 August 1914 at the outbreak of the First World War.  The brigade assembled at Hereford and moved to East Anglia by the end of August 1914.  It joined the 1st Mounted Division in August 1914, replacing 1st South Midland Mounted Brigade which moved to 2nd Mounted Division.

In December 1915, the battery was re-equipped with four 18 pounders.  In March 1916, the South Wales Mounted Brigade (without the battery) was dismounted and left for Egypt.  The brigade was replaced in the 1st Mounted Division by 2/1st Eastern Mounted Brigade and the battery remained with the division until August 1916.

2/IV London (Howitzer) Brigade, RFA (T.F.) of 58th (2/1st London) Division was broken up in July 1916 when it batteries were posted to 2/I and 2/II London Brigades, RFA (T.F.) (that is, before the field artillery brigades of the Territorial Force divisions were numbered in a single sequence).  The brigade was reformed for 58th Division in August 1916 as CCXCIII Brigade, RFA with two gun batteries provided by 1/1st Shropshire RHA (A/CCXCIII Battery) and 1/1st Glamorganshire RHA (B/CCXCIII Battery) and two howitzer batteries (C(H) and D(H) of four 4.5" howitzers each). The Brigade Ammunition Column had been redundant since the South Wales Mounted Brigade had left, so the men were transferred to the 58th Divisional Trench Mortar Brigade.

CCXCIII brigade landed at Le Havre on 22 January 1917.  On 6 February 1917, D(H) Battery was split between D(H)/CCXC Battery and D(H)/CCXCI Battery; the remainder of the brigade became CCXCIII Army Field Artillery Brigade, RFA, now with two batteries of six 18 pounders and one of four 4.5" howitzers.

At the Armistice, the battery (six 18 pounders) was still with CCXCIII Army Brigade, RFA serving as Army Troops with the First Army.

2/1st Glamorganshire

Glamorganshire RHA formed a 2nd line, 2/1st Glamorganshire Battery, RHA, in 1915.

The pre-war Territorial Force infantry divisions were generally supported by four field artillery brigades.  These were numbered I, II, III and IV within each division and consisted of three gun brigades (each of three batteries, equipped with four 15-pounder guns) and a howitzer brigade (two batteries of four 5" howitzers).  Artillery for 2nd Line divisions were formed in a similar manner, with a fractional designation, for example the 2/III North Midland Brigade, RFA (with 2/4th, 2/5th and 2/6th Staffordshire Batteries, RFA) for 59th (2nd North Midland) Division.  Territorial Force artillery brigades were later numbered in a consecutive sequence, and batteries lettered, so for the above example, CCXCVII Brigade, RFA with A, B and C batteries.

The battery, equipped with four 18 pounders, joined CCXCVII Brigade, RFA  (former 2/III North Midland Brigade) in 59th (2nd North Midland) Division in Ireland in early May 1916 and became D/CCXCVII Battery.  On 10 July 1916, the battery transferred to CCXCVIII Brigade, RFA (former 2/IV North Midland Brigade) as C/CCXCVIII Battery.  At this point, CCXCVIII Brigade consisted of three 2nd Line RHA batteries: 2/1st Hampshire as A Battery, 2/1st Essex as B Battery and 2/1st Glamorganshire as C Battery.

In January 1917, the division returned to England.  Before leaving Ireland, the battery was broken up: one section joined A/CCXCVIII Battery (former 2/1st Hampshire Battery, RHA) and the other joined B/CCXCVIII Battery (former 2/1st Essex Battery, RHA) to make them up to six 18 pounders each.

Post war
The battery not reconstituted in the Territorial Force in 1920.

Memorial
The Glamorganshire RHA's wooden memorial board listing the 56 men who died in World War I, and their former commanding officer, Brevet Colonel T.J. David, DSO, OBE, TD, who died on 6 November 1926, is in St Mary's Church, Margam.

See also

 List of Territorial Force horse artillery batteries 1908

Notes

References

Bibliography
 
 
 
 
 
 Norman E.H. Litchfield, The Territorial Artillery 1908–1988 (Their Lineage, Uniforms and Badges), Nottingham: Sherwood Press, 1992, .
 
 
 Ray Westlake, Tracing the Rifle Volunteers, Barnsley: Pen and Sword, 2010, .

External links
Imperial War Museum, War Memorials Register
The Royal Horse Artillery on The Long, Long Trail
The Great War Royal Horse Artillery
Land Forces of Britain, the Empire and Commonwealth – Regiments.org (archive site)

Royal Horse Artillery batteries
Artillery units and formations of World War I
Military units and formations established in 1908
Military units and formations disestablished in 1919
Military units and formations in Wales
Military units and formations in Glamorgan
1908 establishments in the United Kingdom